Vista-class cruise ship may refer to two classes of cruise ships owned by Carnival Corporation & plc:

 Vista-class cruise ship (2002)
 Vista-class cruise ship (2016)